Dream Tower was a 665 m megatall skyscraper proposed for the new Yongsan International Business District, Seoul, South Korea. It would replace the original Triple One Tower. The Triple One Tower was supposed to be 620 meters. However, it has been renamed Dream tower (Korial Tower), and has been redesigned.

With 150 stories, the building was going to be the centrepiece of the Yongsan Dreamhub, a 28-trillion-won ($22.6-billion) project to be built on the banks of the Han River near Yongsan Station.  Demolition of the site started in 2010 and ground breaking was scheduled to start in 2011. As of 2013, the Yongsan Dreamhub plans have been cancelled.

See also
List of buildings with 100 floors or more
List of tallest buildings in Seoul

References

External links
Official site
Emporis page
Article calling for a redesign (in Korean)

Proposed skyscrapers
Skyscrapers in Seoul
Proposed buildings and structures in South Korea
Buildings and structures in Yongsan District
Unbuilt skyscrapers